The Shirley Fire was a wildfire that started on June 13, 2014 at 5:00 PM PDT,  south of Shirley Meadows, Kern County, California, in the southern part of the Sequoia National Forest. The fire rapidly spread, due to dry weather and drought conditions.

As a result, parts of the National Forest were closed, and evacuations were ordered for residences in the area. The cause of the wildfire was not determined. On June 17, the spread of the fire had stopped, and it was reported to be 75% contained. During the late afternoon of June 17, it was reported that the Shirley Fire was 85% contained. On June 18, the fire was 90% contained.

Soon afterwards, many of the firefighters were withdrawn in order to prepare for possible future wildfire outbreaks, due to an approaching heat wave in which temperatures were expected to be in the hundreds. During the same day, the administration of Sequoia National Forest stated that the Shirley Fire was expected to continue burning within the containment line for the next several days, due to continuing drought conditions, an approaching heat wave, and the amount of timber the fire could consume as fuel within its perimeter. On June 20, it was reported that the perimeter of the Shirley Fire was 100% contained, but the wildfire continued to burn well inside of its perimeter while producing moderate amounts of smoke, which was expected to continue for the next several days.

The firefighting efforts and the damage caused by the wildfire cost a total of $12,155,450 dollars (2014 USD). On June 21, the USDA Forest Service and the DOI Bureau of Land Management worked together to initiate cleanup efforts, assess the damage caused by the Shirley Fire, and assist in recovery efforts. The two agencies also worked to help bring the Shirley Fire under control, as well as to help the wildlife recover, and to prevent further degradation of resources. At 6:00 PM PDT on June 26, the roadblocks issued for the Shirley Fire were lifted, even though the wildfire continued to burn within the containment line. On July 15, the Shirley Fire was 100% controlled.

References

2014 California wildfires
Wildfires in Kern County, California
June 2014 events in the United States